Islands in the South China Sea includes the South China Sea Islands (Spratly Islands, Pratas Island, Paracel Islands and Macclesfield Bank), islands on the China coast, on the Vietnam coast, on the Borneo coast, and the peripheral islands of Taiwan, the Philippines, etc.

South China Sea Islands

Pratas Island

Administered as part of Cijin District, Kaohsiung City, Taiwan, Republic of China

Disputed islands

Paracel Islands

The Paracel Islands are occupied by the People's Republic of China (PRC), and claimed by the PRC, the ROC (Taiwan), and Vietnam.

Spratly Islands

The Spratly Islands were, in 1939, fourteen coral islets mostly inhabited by countless seabirds. According to a Chinese 1986 source, the Spratly Islands consist of 14 islands or islets, 6 banks, 113 submerged reefs, 35 underwater banks, 21 underwater shoals. For some reason, neither of these mention the 11th largest naturally occurring island located on the Swallow Reef atoll, occupied by Malaysia. The islands are all of a similar nature; they are cays (or keys) – sand islands formed on old degraded and submerged coral reefs.

Reefs and artificial islands
Note that, according PRC, in the Spratly Islands area, the definition of "island" is applied very liberally to reefs and artificial islands. There are in fact only about a dozen islands with an area greater than 1 hectare.

Scarborough Shoal

Macclesfield Bank

There are no islands, nor any land above sea-level, in the Macclesfield Bank.

In conjunction with the Scarborough Shoal, which also contains no islands, the PRC refer to the combined area as the Zhongsha Islands, even though it contains no islands.

Islands on the southern coast of China

Islands of Hainan
Hainan
Qizhou Liedao

Islands of Guangxi
Weizhou and Xieyang Islands

Islands of Guangdong
Xiachuan Island
Shangchuan Island
Hengqin
Wanshan Archipelago
 Nan'ao

Islands of Macau
Ilha Verde is connected to the Macao Peninsula as a result of land reclamation. Ilha de Coloane and Ilha da Taipa are connected to each other also as a result of land reclamation.
Ilha Verde 
Ilha de Coloane 
Ilha da Taipa

Islands of Hong Kong
See Islands and Peninsulas of Hong Kong for a full list.
Lantau
Hong Kong Island
Po Toi Islands
Cheung Chau

Islands in the Taiwan Strait
Xiamen (Amoy) (Fujian Province, PRC)
 Kinmen (Quemoy) (Fuchien Province, Republic of China (Taiwan))
Lieyu/Lesser Kinmen
Dongding Island
Beiding Island
Fuxing Islet
Menghu Islet
Wuqiu/Daqiu (ROC (Taiwan))
Xiaoqiu (ROC (Taiwan))
Luci Island (Xiuyu, Putian, Fujian, China (PRC))
Penghu (Pescadores) (Taiwan, Republic of China (Taiwan))
Dongji Island
Hua Islet
Cimei
Cijin  (Kaohsiung, Taiwan)

Islands on the western coast of the Philippines
Batanes
Luzon
Mindoro
Calamian Islands
Palawan
Sombrero Island, Batangas
Tingloy, Batangas

Islands of Borneo 
 Jong Batu (Brunei)
 Kabung (Indonesia)
 Lemukutan (Indonesia
 Labuan (Malaysia)
 Louisa Reef (Brunei)
 Merundung (Indonesia)
 Tanjong Pelumpong (Brunei)
 Temaju (Indonesia)
 Tiga Island (Malaysia)

Islands of Indonesia
Riau Archipelago
Batam Island
Bintan Island
Bulan Island
Galang Island
Great Karimun Island
Kundur Island
Little Karimun Island
Rempang Island
Lingga Islands
Tudjuh Archipelago
Anambas Islands
Badas Islands
Natuna Islands
Tambelan Archipelago

Islands on the coast of Malay Peninsula
Besar Island (Malaysia)
Tioman Island (Malaysia)
Redang Island  (Malaysia)
Lang Tengah Island (Malaysia)
Perhentian Islands (Malaysia)
Kapas Island (Malaysia)
Rawa Island (Malaysia)
Pedra Branca (Singapore)
Sibu Island (Malaysia)
Pemanggil Island (Malaysia)

Islands in the Gulf of Siam 
Ko Chang (Thailand)
Ko Kham (Thailand)
Ko Mak (Thailand)
Ko Pha Ngan (Thailand)
Ko Samui (Thailand)
Ko Tao (Thailand)
Koh Tang (Cambodia) 
Dao Phu Quoc (Vietnam)

Islands on the eastern coast of Vietnam
Trà Cổ (vi). Sa Vĩ Cap (vi) in Trà Cổ (vi) island is the North-Easternmost promontory of Vietnam 
Cát Bà Island
Bach Long Vi
Cu Lao Cham (vi)
Lý Sơn District
Con Dao

See also

List of islands of the People's Republic of China
List of islands of the Republic of China

References

 
South China Sea
South China Sea
Maritime Southeast Asia
Pacific Ocean-related lists